Greenhead College is a sixth form college, and former grammar school, located in Huddersfield, in the county of West Yorkshire, England. The current principal is Simon Lett. With over 2,700 students, it is a large sixth form college, attracting students from as far afield as Wakefield, Manchester, Barnsley, Bradford, Leeds, Halifax, Wetherby and even Wales. It is located next to Greenhead Park which is one of the largest parks in Huddersfield.

Reputation
The college topped both The Guardian and The Independent'''s A level college league tables in 2006. It came fourth in 2007 and sixth in 2008. It was also the Sunday Times's Sixth Form College of the Year, 2014-15.
2019 will see 45 students heading to Oxford or Cambridge University

Subject choices
Students usually study 3 subjects at A level. The college is quite flexible with respect to courses being studied, with a proportion of students studying 4 A Levels as long as they meet the required criteria (an average of an A grade at GCSE).  There are over 30 different subjects for students to study.

Admissions
Students from partnership feeder schools are given priority for places at the college, and are required to obtain a minimum of GCSE grades 4 in Maths and English language in addition to three GCSE grade 6s to gain a place at the college. Students usually need to get a B grade in the subjects they are wanting to take.

Current partner schools are All Saints Catholic High School, Newsome High School, Almondbury High School and Language College, Colne Valley High School, North Huddersfield Trust School, Holmfirth High School, Honley High School, King James's School, Moor End Technology College, Netherhall Learning Campus, Royds Hall Academy and Salendine Nook High School.

Students from other schools are considered based on their mock GCSE results, a one-to-one interview and the availability of subject places, this after partner school students have been taken into consideration. Students from the Calderdale secondary schools, including The Brooksbank School, The Crossley Heath School and North Halifax Grammar School, can be accepted through the application process. In 2005, then-principal Martin Rostron said he believed the college has been criticised for selecting only the best students, which he denied, saying that Greenhead took those of all abilities.

Campus

The Greenhead College campus is located on one site, near the centre of Huddersfield, directly next to Greenhead park. The campus is fairly small in comparison with the number of students enrolled - however, it manages to effectively provide provision for a multitude of subjects taught.

The college has approximately 8 main buildings, all of which are internally linked. Each building represents a subject or a group of similar subjects. On 26 May 2004, the college officially opened a new building on the campus, the Conway Building. The building was dedicated to the former principal, Dr Kevin Conway.

The college has a small football field on site and a small hockey field. Two tennis courts were replaced in early 2012 to make way for a new maths and science building, opened by the Duke of Kent. Many enrichments (extra curricular activities) offered by the college are done off campus due to the lack of outdoor space owing to the proximity to Huddersfield town centre.

The infamous statue situated on the side of the Science Building, in the adjacent picture, has recently changed location to outside the newly constructed Rostron Building. College legend has it that on the eve of results day 2015 the metal woman, also known as The Silent Student, moved on her own free will. Her rusty feet remain on the side of the Science Building; she has since regenerated new feet. By 2025 she is expected to move once again.

Redevelopment
In 2008 Ryder Architecture were commissioned to draw up plan for a new project with would provide a series of new buildings which were linked to the existing buildings via a central atrium hub. These buildings provided educational classrooms as well as various support and ancillary accommodation. The existing site was constrained with several existing buildings which would have caused a complex phased construction process. It was estimated that the project would cost approximately £15 million.

In December 2008 a report examining the feasibility of the project was approved by the College. An application was submitted to the Learning and Skills Council in July 2009 with construction works commencing January 2010 for a duration of 2 years. Unfortunately LSC funding was not received and the project was placed on hold until alternative funding could be sourced.

Staff
There are currently around 100 teaching staff to cater for the large number of students, in addition to the canteen staff, IT technicians, lab technicians and caretakers who also serve in the college.

Hierarchy
The College Principal is Simon Lett, who is supported by deputy principal Mo Bunter. Heads of department and heads of subject take a lead on teaching and learning within their subject area, supported by subject teachers and assistants.

Extracurricular activities
Greenhead is well praised for its enrichment programmes which encourages pupils to partake in extracurricular activities designed to build students character, their personal, sporting and social interests and prepares them more effectively both for higher education and future employment. It was first introduced in 1990. Its most recent praise was from Ofsted in 2011 from their spot check report.

Enrichment is mandatory for student to undertake, this encourages pupils to partake supporting the programs success. There are a huge variety of courses for students to choose form including The Duke of Edinburgh's Award, sports, music and drama, information technology, voluntary services and The World Challenge; additionally students are free to start new courses on the proviso they can gain enough support for them. In 2011 a total of 79 different courses were available to students including 22 different sporting activates such as badminton, basketball, cycling, football (men and women’s), rugby (men and women’s), judo and squash and 9 different music groups. Alongside a variety of enrichment activities offered as part of the college programme, the music department offers annual opportunities for students across Kirklees to perform and compose. In 2018, the Greenhead College 'Carol for Yorkshire' raised over £700 for charity, and 2021 is the inaugural year of the Greenhead New Music Competition. Taster sessions are provided so that students can make informed decisions.

As part of the enrichment program, pupils must undertake one week of PaWS (Projects and Work Shadowing) in their first year. Work shadowing placements include medical, political, scientific and language based jobs, usually at a senior level within the respective companies. If a pupil does not wish to do work shadowing, many projects, from circus skills to mathematical art, are available.

Awards
 Queen's Anniversary Prize in 1996
 The Educational Institution of the Year Award in 1999
 The Beacon College Award in May 1999, and again in September 2004
 The Queen's Anniversary Prize for Excellence in 2000 (for the second time)
 Officially announced as "outstanding" in the May 2004 Ofsted report and again in the 2008 report.
 Sunday Times's Parent Power Top State Sixth Form College of the Year 2014.
Music Mark Award

Notable alumni
Lisa Head, first female bomb disposal officer in the British Army to be killed in operations
Judy Hirst, FRS FRSC, a British scientist specialising in mitochondrial biology. Prof Hirst is Interim Director of the MRC Mitochondrial Biology Unit at the University of Cambridge
Kieran Hodgson, actor and musician who co-wrote and starred in Prince Andrew: The Musical in 2022
Jill Kemp, professional classical recorder player
Jonathan Le Billon, actor best known for playing Brian Drake in HollyoaksJanine Mellor, actress best known for playing Kelsey Phillips in BBC One's Casualty''
Kearnan Myall, rugby union footballer for London Wasps
Matt Roberts, television presenter, best known for his work on BBC Sport's Moto GP coverage
Mona Siddiqui OBE FRSE FRSA, British Muslim academic
Steven Woodcock, award-winning film director, writer, and producer
Neil O'Brien OBE, Conservative MP

References

External links
 

Schools in Huddersfield
Educational institutions established in 1980
Learning and Skills Beacons
Sixth form colleges in West Yorkshire
Education in Kirklees
1980 establishments in England
Huddersfield